Pensarosa was a settlement established along the east bank of Basin Bayou. The settlement grew corn, beans, and peas but an industry of agriculture was never really established. The settlement was later abandoned.

References 

Former populated places in Florida